Caroline Vout  (born c. 1972) is a British classicist and art historian.  she is a Professor in classics at the University of Cambridge and a fellow of Christ's College. In 2021 she became Director of the Museum of Classical Archaeology, Cambridge.

Career
Vout was born in Durham. She read Classics at Newnham College, Cambridge, graduating in 1995, before taking a master's degree in Roman and Byzantine Art at the Courtauld Institute. She then returned to Cambridge for her doctorate, which was supervised by Keith Hopkins and Mary Beard.

Upon finishing her doctorate she lectured at the Universities of Bristol and Nottingham until being appointed to as a fellow of Christ's College in 2006.

She curated an exhibition on Antinous at the Henry Moore Institute in Leeds and is on the academic advisory panel for the department of Greek and Roman antiquities at the Fitzwilliam Museum. She has written for The Times Literary Supplement and The Guardian, and appeared on the 2011 BBC Four documentary Fig Leaf: The Biggest Cover-Up In History and on BBC Radio 4's In Our Time.

Books
Antinous: the Face of the Antique. Leeds: Henry Moore Sculpture Trust, 2006.
Power and Eroticism in Imperial Rome. Cambridge: Cambridge University Press, 2007.
The Hills of Rome: Signature of an Eternal City. Cambridge: Cambridge University Press, 2012
Sex on Show: Seeing the Erotic in Greece and Rome. London: British Museum Press, 2013
Epic Visions: Visuality in Greek and Latin Epic and its Reception. (co-edited with Helen Lovet). Cambridge: Cambridge University Press
Classical Art: A Life History from Antiquity to the Present. Princeton: Princeton University Press, 2018.

Awards
 The Art Book Award (awarded by the Association of Art Historians) for Antinous; 2008. (Not available online to non-members.)
 Philip Leverhulme Prize, 2008 
 Fellow, Society of Antiquaries of London

References
 

People from Durham, England
Alumni of Newnham College, Cambridge
Fellows of Christ's College, Cambridge
Members of the University of Cambridge faculty of classics
English classical scholars
Women classical scholars
Historians of ancient Rome
Academics of the University of Nottingham
Living people
Fellows of the Society of Antiquaries of London
Year of birth missing (living people)